The Thirteenth Child is an English-language opera in two acts, composed by Danish composer Poul Ruders in 2016, to a libretto by Ruders manager Becky Starobin and her husband, guitarist David Starobin. The opera, Ruders fifth, is inspired by the fairytale "The Twelve Brothers".

Prior to being performed on stage, the opera was recorded for the Starobin family's Bridge Records label.

The premiere production was commissioned by Santa Fe Opera and the Odense Symfoniorkester.

Performance history
The opera premiered on 27 July 2019 at Santa Fe Opera. Paul Daniel conducted the staging by Darko Tresnjak, the set was designed by Alexander Dodge, costumes designed by Rita Ryack, lighting design by York Kennedy, projection design by Aaron Rhyne, chorus master was 
Susanne Sheston.

Roles

Instrumentation
2 clarinets, 2 saxophones, 2 bassoons, 4 horns in F, 2 trumpets in B♭, 2 trombones, tuba, 2 percussion sections, harp, piano, 3 synthesizers, 10 violins, 8 violas, 6 cellos, 2 double bass.

Recording
2019 Odense Symphony Orchestra, Bridge Academy Singers, soprano Sarah Shafer (Lyra), mezzo-soprano Tamara Mumford (Queen Gertrude), bass-baritone Ashraf Sewailam (Drokan), bass Matt Boehler (King Hjarne), tenor David Portillo (Benjamin), tenor Alasdair Kent (Prince Frederic, Toke), bass Alex Rosen (Corbin). Conductors: David Starobin, Benjamin Shwartz (Bridge 9527)

References

External links
The Thirteenth Child, website by the librettists

2016 operas
English-language operas
Operas by Poul Ruders
Operas based on fairy tales
Works based on Grimms' Fairy Tales
Operas